Bisson was the name ship of her class of destroyers built for the French Navy during the 1910s, entering service in 1913. She served in the Mediterranean Sea during the First World War, sinking the Austro-Hungarian submarine  on 6 July 1915 and took part in the Battle of Durazzo in December 1915 and the Battle of the Strait of Otranto in May 1917. She was stricken in 1933 and scrapped in 1939.

Design and description
The Bisson class were enlarged versions of the preceding  built to a more standardized design. They displaced  at normal load. Their crew numbered 4 officers and 77–84 men.

Renaudin was powered by a pair of Breguet steam turbines, each driving one propeller shaft using steam provided by four Guyot-du Temple water-tube boilers.

The primary armament of the Bisson-class ships consisted of two  Modèle 1893 guns in single mounts, one each fore and aft of the superstructure, and four  Modèle 1902 guns distributed amidships. They were also fitted with two twin mounts for  torpedo tubes amidships, one on each broadside.

Construction and career
Bisson was ordered on 23 November 1910 as part of the 1910 naval program from the Arsenal de Toulon and was laid down on 1 January 1911. She was launched on 12 September 1912 and began her sea trials on 10 February 1913. The ship was commissioned on 8 September and was assigned to the 6th Destroyer Flotilla of the 1st Naval Army in the Mediterranean.

First World War
On 6 May 1915, Bisson and the  spotted the Austrian light cruiser  between Cephalonia and Calabria and chased the Austrian ship, but Admiral Spaun outpaced the two French ships and escaped. On 23 May 1915, Italy declared war on Austro-Hungary, and Bisson was one of 12 French destroyers deployed in support of the Italian Fleet, joining the 1st Flotilla based at Brindisi.

Regular duties included escorting ships to Montenegro and supporting Franco-Italian patrols aimed at stopping Austro-Hungarian surface ships and submarines from passing through the Straits of Otranto. On 8 June, Bisson formed part of a force of four Italian destroyers and three French destroyers escorting the British light cruiser  on a patrol off the Albanian coast intended to destroy Austro-Hungarian light naval forces. Despite the strong escort, the Austro-Hungarian submarine  managed to torpedo Dublin, killing 13 of the British cruiser's crew, but the escort managed to drive away several more suspected submarine attacks, and Dublin successfully reached Brindisi without further damage.

On 12 July, Bisson and sister ship  raided the island of Lastovo off the Austrian coast of the Adriatic (now part of Croatia), destroying oil stores and the telegraph station. This attack was simultaneous with the Italian occupation of Palagruža. On 5 August the Austrian submarine  made an unsuccessful attack on the Italian  armed merchant cruiser . Several destroyers, including Bisson, were sent to intercept the Austrian submarine, and on the next morning Bisson spotted U-3 on the surface and opened fire, sinking the submarine. Twelve of U-3s crew were rescued.

Battle of Durazzo

On 29 November 1915, the Austro-Hungarian cruiser  and five destroyers attacked the port of Durazzo, Albania, where two Austro-Hungarian destroyers struck mines, with one sinking and the second being taken under tow. Allied naval forces sortied from Brindisi in response, including five French destroyers (Bisson, and ), two British cruisers ( and ), two Italian cruisers ( and )and four Italian destroyers. Dartmouth and the French destroyers intercepted the slowly retreating Austro-Hungarian force, with the destroyers being sent against Triglav while Dartmouth engaged Helgoland. The approach of the French destroyers forced the Austrians to scuttle Triglav, but Helgoland and the remaining Austrian destroyers managed to escape.

The French and Italian destroyers set off in pursuit of the Austro-Hungarian ships, but broke off the chase as they neared the Austrian base of Cattaro (now Kotor). After turning back, the Franco-Italian force was unsuccessfully attacked by the Austro-Hungarian submarine U-4.

Otranto Straits

On the night of 14/15 May 1917, the Austro-Hungarian fleet carried out an attack on the Otranto Barrage. The cruisers ,  and Helgoland attacked the drifters of the Otranto Barrage, while the destroyers Csepel and Balaton  mounted a diversionary attack against shipping off the coast of Albania. Bisson was part of a group of four Italian and French warships patrolling North of the Barrage line to protect it against attacks. On hearing reports of the attacks, Rear Admiral Alfredo Acton, the Allied commander, ordered Mirabellos group to steer south to intercept the Austrian forces, while more powerful forces, including the light cruisers Dartmouth and  set out from Bridisi. The Mirabello group, including Bisson encountered the Austro-Hungarian cruisers on the morning of 15 May and as their guns were outranged by those of the cruisers, shadowed the Austro-Hungarian ships until more powerful forces could engage, but the slower French destroyers could not keep pace with the Austro-Hungarian ships and fell astern of Mirabello.

Bisson rescued the crew of an Italian flying boat, that had forced to ditch by engine trouble, before she, together with the rest of the Mirabello group, was ordered to join up with Dartmouth and Bristol. However, first Mirabello briefly lost power owing to contamination of fuel, then Commandant Rivière suffered engine failure. Mirabello took Commandant Rivière under tow while Bisson escorted the two ships on their voyage home.

In June 1918, in response to the threat posed by the potential seizure of ships of the Russian Black Sea Fleet by the Germans following the Treaty of Brest-Litovsk and the German advance into Ukraine, Bisson formed part of the escort for four French Pre-dreadnought battleships deployed to Mudros in the Aegean Sea.

Post war
In 1919, Bisson was deployed to the Black Sea. She was stricken in June 1933 and scrapped in 1939.

Notes

References

Bibliography

 
 

Bisson-class destroyers
Ships built in France
1913 ships